Johnny Socko was an American third wave ska band formed in Bloomington, Indiana, United States, in 1990. It was founded by Dylan Wissing. Originally signed to BiB Records and later Asian Man Records, they later started their own record label, Triple R Records. They were known as a band that toured heavily, having performed over 2,000 shows since their inception, but are currently not working. One of their songs, "Full Trucker Effect", is used in its entirety as part of the introduction to the Bubba The Love Sponge show on Sirius Satellite Radio. The band takes its name from Johnny Sokko and his Flying Robot, a 1960s Japanese action television show.

Michael "Trout" Wiltrout, the group's former vocalist, has since formed The Leisure Kings with Sean Baker, as well as providing lead vocals for the bands Mr. Sparkle and The Impalas. Joey Welch, the group's former guitarist, has since formed the Born Again Floozies (Formerly including Charlie Krone as well) and continues to work with the Las Vegas Body Snatchers. Chris Smail, Charlie Krone, Josh Silbert, and Matt Wilson now play as a punk/powerpop band called Coolidge. Saxophonist Josh Silbert also plays in the Impalas with Wiltrout and Wilson and fronts the electronic/experimental band ESW. Eric Evans was the original trumpet player and toured and recorded with the band for the first four years. Before that, he toured internationally with Ringling Brother's Barnum Bailey Circus and on cruise ships. Evans plays with a number of projects including funk/soul band The Hollywood Getdown and fronts his funk/jazz group, The Raoul Duke Jazz All-Stars.

The original line-up of the band reunited for one night to open the 2009 Broad Ripple Music Fest on October 16, 2009. The performance was very well received and received the top honor in The Indianapolis Star'''s Metromix readers' poll.

Influence
Johnny Socko was influenced by the American rock band Red Hot Chili Peppers whose musical style primarily consists of rock with an emphasis on funk, as well as Fishbone, which plays a fusion of ska, punk rock, funk, hard rock and soul.

Discography
Studio albumsBovaquarium (1994, B.I.B.)Oh I Do Hope It's Roast Beef (1996, B.I.B.)Full Trucker Effect (1997, Asian Man Records)Quatro (1999, Scarab)Johnny Socko (2002, Triple R)

Live albumsDouble Live'' (2001, Scarab)

Current members 
Joshua Silbert (saxophone, vocals)
Dylan Wissing (drums)
Matt Wilson (bass guitar, vocals)
Chris Smail (guitar, vocals)
Demian Hostetter (trumpet, vocals)

Past and occasional members 
Joe Welch (guitars)
Michael Wiltrout (vocals)
Charlie Krone (trombone)
Steve Mascari (bass guitar)
Rob Henson (bass guitar)
Eric Lenington (trombone & bass guitar)
Nils Fredland (trombone)
Eric Evans (trumpet)
Jeremy Radway (bass guitar)
Philip Williams (bass guitar)

Related projects
Born Again Floozies
Coolidge
ESW
Hush
Las Vegas Body Snatchers
The Leisure Kings

References

External links 
Johnny Socko's Myspace page
Johnny Socko on VH1.com

American ska musical groups
Asian Man Records artists